Victor Engström (25 April 1989 – 1 July 2013) was a Swedish bandy player who played for Västerås SK as a midfielder or forward. Engström was a youth product of Västerås SK and made his first team debut in the 2006–07 season. Engström also played for the Sweden U19 team that won the U19 Nordic Under-19 Bandy Championship 2007, where he scored one goal against Finland. On 1 July 2013, Engström died of liver cancer, 24 years old.

References

External links

Swedish bandy players
1989 births
2013 deaths
Västerås SK Bandy players